Wu Jian (born 25 May 1986) is a Chinese male track and field athlete who competes in the discus throw. He was a silver medallist at the 2003 World Youth Championships in Athletics and took his first major senior medal (a bronze) at the 2011 Asian Athletics Championships. He represented his country at the 2011 World Championships in Athletics and at the 2014 Asian Games.

At national level, he has had four victories at the Chinese Athletics Championships, winning in 2008, 2010, 2012 and 2014. He placed fourth at the Chinese City Games in 2003 at the age of 17. At the National Games of China, he has represented his native Jiangsu on three occasions: he was discus runner-up to Li Shaojie in 2009 before taking consecutive titles at the 2013 and 2017 Games.

International competitions

National titles
Chinese Athletics Championships
Discus throw: 2008, 2010, 2012, 2014
National Games of China
Discus throw: 2013, 2017

References

External links

Living people
1986 births
Athletes from Jiangsu
Chinese male discus throwers
Athletes (track and field) at the 2014 Asian Games
Athletes (track and field) at the 2018 Asian Games
World Athletics Championships athletes for China
Asian Games competitors for China
21st-century Chinese people